United Nations Security Council resolution 877, adopted unanimously on 21 October 1993, after recalling 808 (1993) and 827 (1993), the Council appointed the nomination by the Secretary-General Boutros Boutros-Ghali of Mr. Ramón Escovar Salom for the position of Prosecutor at the International Criminal Tribunal for the former Yugoslavia (ICTY).

See also
 Bosnian War
 Breakup of Yugoslavia
 Croatian War of Independence
 List of United Nations Security Council Resolutions 801 to 900 (1993–1994)
 Yugoslav Wars

References

External links
 
Text of the Resolution at undocs.org

 0877
 0877
1993 in Yugoslavia
 0877
October 1993 events